Age of Zombies is an action-adventure survival horror video game developed and published by Halfbrick Studios. It was released for PlayStation Portable, PlayStation 3 and iOS in 2010, for Android in 2011, for PlayStation Vita in 2013, and for Ouya in 2014.

Reception

The iOS and PSP versions received "generally favorable reviews", while the PS Vita version received above-average reviews, according to the review aggregation website Metacritic.

References

External links
 

2010 video games
Action-adventure games
Android (operating system) games
Halfbrick Studios games
IOS games
Ouya games
PlayStation Portable games
PlayStation Vita games
Survival horror video games
Video games about zombies
Video games developed in Australia
BlitWorks games
Single-player video games